The Climate Coalition is an organisation dedicated to action against climate change in the United Kingdom. The Climate Coalition is the operating name of the registered charity The Climate Movement. Along with its sister organisations Stop Climate Chaos Cymru and Stop Climate Chaos Scotland, the group includes over 130 organisations — including the National Trust, Women's Institute, Oxfam, and the RSPB.

It held the biggest ever climate lobby on 26 June 2019, with over 12,000 arriving at Parliament to tell their representatives urgent action is needed. It holds two main annual campaigns: Show The Love and Speak Up Week, as well as the Green Heart Hero Awards.

References

External links

Environmental charities based in the United Kingdom